The Curse of the Doll People (  "Infernal Dolls"), or The Devil Doll Men, is a 1961 Mexican horror film directed by Benito Alazraki. It was produced by Cinematográfica Calderón S.A. The screenplay by Alfredo Salazar is an uncredited adaptation of the novel Burn Witch Burn! by A. Merritt.

Plot
The story surrounds four men who are cursed by a voodoo priest for stealing a sacred idol from his temple. Soon after being surrounded, evil 'doll' people begin to kill their family members.

Cast
 Elvira Quintana as Karina
 Ramón Gay as Dr. Armando Valdés
 Roberto G. Rivera as Molinar
 Quintin Bulnes as Zandor
 Alfonso Arnold

Release
K. Gordon Murray imported the film to the US and added several English-language scenes.

Reception
Writing in The Zombie Movie Encyclopedia, academic Peter Dendle criticized the American import as incoherent.  Glenn Kay, who wrote Zombie Movies: The Ultimate Guide, called the film "a strictly by-the-numbers exercise that must have elicited more giggles than gasps on its release".

References

External links
 

1961 films
1961 horror films
Films based on American horror novels
Mexican zombie films
1960s Spanish-language films
Films about curses
Films about Voodoo
1960s Mexican films